Thatcher: The Final Days is a 1991 British television film about the events surrounding the final few days of Margaret Thatcher's time as Prime Minister. It was written by Richard Maher, directed by Tim Sullivan and starred Sylvia Syms in the role of Thatcher. The film was produced for ITV by Granada Television and first shown on ITV on Wednesday 11 September 1991 at 9:00pm.

The film was released on DVD in 2007.

Cast

 Sylvia Syms - Margaret Thatcher
 Bruce Alexander - John Gummer
 Henry Ayrton - Thatcher's Aide 
 Christopher Benjamin - George Younger 
 Trevor Bowen - Kenneth Baker 
 Stephen Boxer - John Sergeant 
 Tom Chadbon - Edward Leigh 
 Julian Curry - David Harris
 Paul Daneman - Douglas Hurd 
 Edward de Souza - John Wakeham
 Keith Drinkel - John Major 
 David Hargreaves - Charles Powell 
 Bernard Holley - Paddy Ashdown 
 Bernard Horsfall - Alan Clark
 Glyn Houston - Bernard Ingham 
 Harold Innocent - Peter Morrison
 Tony Mathews - Gordon Reece 
 Michael McStay - Michael Mates 
 Roland Oliver - Kenneth Clarke
 Robert Reynolds - Anthony Teasdale 
 Christian Rodska - Neil Kinnock
 Paul Rogers - Sir Geoffrey Howe 
 Toby Salaman - Tim Yeo
 Shaughan Seymour - Keith Hampson 
 Malcolm Stoddard - Tim Bell
 David Sumner - Peter Temple-Morris 
 John Wood - Michael Heseltine

See also

 Margaret (2009 film), a BBC film also depicting the final days of Thatcher's premiership
 Premiership of Margaret Thatcher
 1990 Conservative Party (UK) leadership election
 Cultural depictions of Margaret Thatcher

References

External links
 
 
 Thatcher: The Final Days a BFI profile

1991 television films
1991 films
British television films
ITV television dramas
Films about Margaret Thatcher
British political drama television series
1991 in British television
1991 in British politics
Television shows produced by Granada Television
English-language television shows
Films set in 1990
Films directed by Tim Sullivan